Sylwester Andrzej Porowski (born April 7, 1938 in Bierzyn, Lower Silesian Voivodeship), is a Polish physicist specializing in solid-state and high pressure physics. He is the Co-Director and Board Member of The Institute of High Pressure Physics, Polish Academy of Sciences in Warsaw.

In 2001 Professor Porowski's team built the blue semiconductor laser, a pioneering feat in the study of optoelectronics.

Porowski was awarded Prize of the Foundation for Polish Science in 2013 for developing a high-pressure method for producing gallium nitride monocrystals.

References

External links
 Unipress Website

1938 births
Living people
People from Strzelin
20th-century Polish physicists
University of Warsaw alumni
Polish inventors